Daniel Connor is an American politician who served in the Vermont House of Representatives from 2012 to 2019.

References

Living people
University of Vermont alumni
21st-century American politicians
Members of the Vermont House of Representatives
Year of birth missing (living people)